Syncellus or synkellos is an ecclesiastical office in the Eastern Catholic or Orthodox Churches. 

As part of a name, it can also refer to several people who bore this title:

 Euthymius I Syncellus, Byzantine ecclesiastic, Patriarch of Constantinople in 907–912
 George Syncellus, 9th-century Byzantine chronicler and ecclesiastic
 Michael Syncellus, 9th-century Byzantine saint

See also 
 Protosyncellus